Sui Wo Court (Chinese: 穗禾苑) is one of the first estates under Home Ownership Scheme. It is located in Fo Tan, Sha Tin District, Hong Kong.

Built in 1980, it is located on a mountain above Wo Che and east of central Fo Tan, northwest of Sha Tin. The court was designed by Palmer and Turner and received a Silver Medal at the 1981 Hong Kong Institute of Architects Annual Awards. The scenery of Sha Tin and Tolo Harbour is visible from the estate.

Blocks
Completed in 1980, it offers 3,501 flats for sale. It consists of 9 blocks of non-standard type:
 Block A - Fung Yue House
 Block B - Fung Yat House
 Block C - Fung Lin House
 Block D - Hing Wan House
 Block E - Hing Sing House
 Block F - Hing On House
 Block G - Wing Mau House
 Block H - Wing Cheung House
 Block J - Wing Hing House

Floor area of Flats ranged from 43 – 65 m2 with saleable area between 38 – 57 m2. Its initial sale price was between 100,200 and 252,700 Hong Kong dollars.

Transport
The estate has its own bus terminus beside the commercial centre. The government is also considering building an escalator link between Sui Wo Court and Fo Tan station.

See also
List of Home Ownership Scheme Courts in Hong Kong

References

External links

Website (in Chinese)
Sui Wo Court Flat Owners Association
Information from Housing Authority
Sui Wo Court Commercial Centre on The Link REIT website

Residential buildings completed in 1980
Fo Tan
Home Ownership Scheme
1980 establishments in Hong Kong